Victor Aly (born 2 June 1994) is a German field hockey player who plays as a goalkeeper for Großflottbek and the German national team.

Club career
Aly comes from Othmarschen in Hamburg so he started playing hockey for the local club Großflottbek. He played eight years for Rot-Weiss Köln in Cologne. In May 2020, it was announced he returned to Großflottbek for the 2020–21 season.

International career
Aly was a part of the Germany under-21 team which won the 2013 Junior World Cup. He made his debut for the senior national team in February 2015 in a test match against South Africa. In December 2019, he was nominated for the FIH Goalkeeper of the Year Award. On 28 May 2021, he was named in the squad for the 2021 EuroHockey Championship and was named as a reserve for the 2020 Summer Olympics.

References

External links

1994 births
Living people
Field hockey players from Hamburg
German male field hockey players
Male field hockey goalkeepers
2018 Men's Hockey World Cup players
Rot-Weiss Köln players
21st-century German people